The EL/M-2238 3D-STAR is a multi-purpose air and surface-search naval radar system developed by IAI Elta for medium-sized ships like corvettes and frigates. STAR is an acronym of Surveillance & Threat Alert Radar.

Design and description 
It is a 3D multi-beam and multi-mode fully coherent pulse Doppler search radar which functions in the S band (2-4 GHz). It can perform both surface and aerial search simultaneously. It is designed to support anti-air and surface-gunnery systems. The antenna in the Doppler sensor has a planar array for 3D multi-beam operations and a vertical array of strip radiators. It has programmable signal processing and is stabilized within a roll and pitch of 20 degrees. It comes in three variants - a larger dual-face version, a medium version and a small single-face version.

Operators 
The radar is installed in ships of the following navies:

Godavari-class frigates
Shivalik class frigates

Endurance-class landing platform dock

Mariscal Sucre class frigate - Installed while upgrading the first two ships Mariscal Sucre (F-21) and Almirante Brión (F-22). Installed on the stub mast.

See also 
EL/M-2080 Green Pine
EL/M-2248 MF-STAR

References 

Sea radars
Military radars of Israel
Elta products